The 1983–84 Cleveland Cavaliers season was the 14th NBA basketball season in Cleveland, Ohio.

Draft picks

Roster

Regular season

Season standings

z - clinched division title
y - clinched division title
x - clinched playoff spot

Record vs. opponents

Game log

|- align="center" bgcolor="#ffcccc"
| 19
| December 3, 1983
| @ Atlanta
| L 91–102
|
|
|
| The Omni6,291
| 6–13
|- align="center" bgcolor="#ccffcc"
| 21
| December 7, 1983
| Atlanta
| W 106–92
|
|
|
| Richfield Coliseum2,589
| 7–14
|- align="center" bgcolor="#ccffcc"
| 30
| December 29, 1983
| Atlanta
| W 88–77
|
|
|
| Richfield Coliseum3,622
| 9–21
|- align="center" bgcolor="#ffcccc"
| 31
| December 30, 1983
| @ Atlanta
| L 98–109
|
|
|
| The Omni5,201
| 9–22

|- align="center" bgcolor="#ffcccc"
| 53
| February 21, 1984
| @ Atlanta
| L 84–102
|
|
|
| The Omni4,940
| 20–33

|- align="center" bgcolor="#ccffcc"
| 63
| March 13, 1984
| Atlanta
| W 92–83
|
|
|
| Richfield Coliseum3,103
| 23–40

Player statistics

Player Statistics Citation:

Awards and records

Transactions

References

Cleveland Cavaliers seasons
Cle
Cleveland
Cleveland